"What If I Said" is a song written and recorded by American country music artist Anita Cochran as a duet with Steve Wariner.  The single was released in November 1997 as was Cochran's only No. 1 single on the U.S. Billboard Hot Country Singles & Tracks chart, as well as her only Top 40 single on that chart. In addition, the song was Wariner's first chart entry in three years, as well as his first No. 1 since 1989's "I Got Dreams." The song was nominated by the Country Music Association for Vocal Duet of the Year in 1998.

"What If I Said" can be found on Cochran's 1997 album Back to You, as well as Wariner's 1998 album Burnin' the Roadhouse Down.

Content
The song is a ballad with Cochran and Wariner portraying two characters who are in unsatisfying relationships with other people, but express their feelings for each other.

It is in the key of C major with a primary chord pattern of C9-Dm75 and an approximate tempo of 60 beats per minute.

Personnel
From Back to You liner notes.

Musicians
 Anita Cochran - vocals
 Eddie Bayers - drums
 Eric Darken - percussion
 Paul Franklin - steel guitar
 Nashville String Machine - strings
 Steve Nathan - piano
 Don Potter - acoustic guitar
 Brent Rowan - electric guitar
 Steve Wariner - vocals
 Willie Weeks - bass guitar

Music video
The music video was directed by Jim Shea and premiered in 1997.

Chart positions

Year-end charts

References

1997 singles
Anita Cochran songs
Steve Wariner songs
Male–female vocal duets
Warner Records singles
Song recordings produced by Jim Ed Norman
1997 songs